Helena Wood Smith (March 9, 1865 – August 1914) was an American artist.

Early life and education
Helena Wood Smith was born on March 9, 1865, in Bangor, Maine. She was the sister of novelist, Ruel Perley Smith. Helena attended the Pratt Institute in Brooklyn.

Career
By 1912, she had moved to Carmel-by-the-Sea, California, and was the instructor of "drawing and painting from nature" at the local School of Arts & Crafts. She exhibited at the San Francisco Art Association (1910–1913), Carmel Arts & Crafts Club (1913), and the Hotel Del Monte Art Gallery (1911–13).

Part of her early exhibition history includes the: Boston Art Club (1893–1900), Annuals of the Pennsylvania Academy of Fine Arts (1896–1897), Water Color Club of Washington, D.C. (1902), and Annual of the Art Club of Philadelphia (1900). At the latter, her entry was entitled "Merestead, Gardens of the Pilgrims".  Smith was also discussed in Corelli C. W. Simpson's Leaflet of Artists (J.W. Bacon, 1893).

Personal life 
In August 1914, she was strangled and buried on the beach by her lover, Japanese art-photographer George Kodani, who was convicted of second degree murder and sentenced to life in prison.

References

1865 births
1914 deaths
Artists from Bangor, Maine
American murder victims
Deaths by strangulation in the United States
People murdered in California
People from Carmel-by-the-Sea, California
History of women in California